Ruapuke is a small farming community (predominantly sheep and cattle farmers) in the Waikato region on the slopes of Karioi, between Raglan and Kawhia in New Zealand.

History 
The introduction to 'Ruapuke' says, "The greater part of the Ruapuke District is of a sandy loam, and at one time carried a large population of Maoris, as is evidenced by old pas, great heaps of shells, warehouse sites and numerous kumara storage pits. When the first Europeans arrived the sandy country was covered with patches of light bush, with a big proportion of Karaka, Puriri, and Cabbage trees. The balance was covered with Tauhinu, Teatree, Flax and Fern. The clay portion of the district, (inland and on the slopes of Mt Karioi) was in heavy bush." The archaeological map shows over 40 sites in the area. The European settlers, George Charlton and his sons-in-law, Captains Swann and Liddell, arrived in the 1850s. [1]

The  Ruapuke block was bought by the government from Ngāti Whakamarurangi between 1854 and 1856 for £300. A Waitangi Tribunal report says, "McLean appears to have applied pressure on Māori sellers to induce them to accept a price they had previously rejected . . . We find that, in this way, the Crown failed to act honourably and in good faith".

Ruapuke had a school from 1877 till 1954. The school was rebuilt in 1937. It has been replaced by a school bus.There was a store at Motakotako from the 1860s. From about 1875 to 1883 it was run by John William Ellis, who later founded Ellis & Burnand. Another store opened briefly in the 1890s.

From 1873 until the 1900s there were up to three flaxmills running.

Demographics 
The area north of Ruapuke Beach Rd is in meshblock 0853300 (N) and south of it in 0861800 (S). They had these census figures -

Roads 
It is often used for rally car competitions.

Roading History 
Until 1864 settlement was along the coast and relied on access by boat. Then a track was cut along what is now Waimaori Rd.

Ruapuke Rd (originally known as Ruapuke Mountain Rd) was built as a shorter route from 1902 and was metalled in 1935.

Surfing 
Until the 1990s the beach largely remained unknown, used by local residents and a few surfing and surfcasting fishing enthusiasts. International surfing competitions such as the Billabong (clothing) Pro and the Rip Curl Pro are now held at Ruapuke beach, providing conditions oblige.

References

External links
 BBC Profile

Populated places in Waikato
Waikato District